The Leibniz Institute for Solid State and Materials Research in Dresden (German: Leibniz-Institut für Festkörper- und Werkstoffforschung Dresden) – in short IFW Dresden – is a non-university research institute and a member of the Gottfried Wilhelm Leibniz Scientific Community. It is concerned with modern materials science and combines explorative research in physics, chemistry and materials science with technological development of new materials and products.

Research
The IFW’s research program is jointly set up and implemented by scientists of the different IFW institutes. It comprises the following five research areas:

 Superconductivity & superconductors
 Magnetism and magnetic materials
 Molecular Nanostructures and Molecular solids
 Metastable alloys
 Stress-driven architectures and phenomena

Research institutes
The IFW consists of five research institutes
Institute for Solid State Research, Director: Prof. Dr. Bernd Büchner
Institute for Metallic Materials, Director: Prof. Dr. Kornelius Nielsch
Institute for Complex Materials, Director:  Dr. Thomas Gemming (temp.)
Institute for Integrative Nanosciences, Director: Prof. Dr. Oliver G. Schmidt
Institute for Theoretical Solid State Physics,  Director: Prof. Dr. Jeroen van den Brink

History
The IFW Dresden was founded on January 1, 1992 transforming the former  Academy Institute to an Institute of the ‘Blaue Liste’. It emerged from the largest materials science center of the former GDR, which was at the time already internationally acknowledged. Since then the IFW developed into a leading institute in selected topics of materials science. The IFW is founding member of DRESDEN-concept, a research alliance in Dresden that was founded in 2010 to boost TU Dresden's application for the German Universities Excellence Initiative.

At present the IFW employs about 400 people, among them 190 scientists, mostly physicists, chemists and materials engineers. 80 of them are young scientists working in the IFW on their doctoral thesis. About 100 guest scientists from all over the world come every year for some weeks or months to work at the IFW. The annual budget of 23 Million Euro is supplied by the Federal government and by the German states in equal parts, the latter mainly by the Free State of Saxony. Additionally to institutional funding the IFW Dresden raises project resources of about 5 Million Euro per year.

External links
 http://www.ifw-dresden.de

Foundations based in Germany
Physics institutes
Leibniz Association
Education in Dresden
Science and technology in East Germany